Anjo Mau is a Brazilian telenovela produced and broadcast by TV Globo. It premiered on 2 February 1976 and ended on 24 August 1976, with a total of 175 episodes. It's the seventeenth "novela das sete" to be aired at the timeslot. It is created by Cassiano Gabus Mendes, directed by Fábio Sabag with Régis Cardoso.

Cast

References

External links 
 

1976 telenovelas
TV Globo telenovelas
Brazilian telenovelas
1976 Brazilian television series debuts
1976 Brazilian television series endings
Television shows set in Rio de Janeiro (city)
Portuguese-language telenovelas
Nannies in fiction